Klondike Annie is a 1936 American Western film starring Mae West and Victor McLaglen. The film was co-written by West from her play Frisco Kate, which she wrote in 1921 and a story written by the duo Marion Morgan and George Brendan Dowell. Raoul Walsh directed.

Plot
Mae West portrays a kept woman by the name of Rose Carlton, "The Frisco Doll". She murders her keeper Chan Lo in self-defence and escapes on a steamer to Nome, Alaska, wanted for murder. She is joined mid-voyage by a missionary, Sister Annie Alden. Sister Annie is on her way to rescue a financially troubled mission in Nome, and inspires Rose, but dies en route. Rose assumes the identity of Sister Annie to avoid arrest, dressing her as a prostitute in a scene later deleted by the censors.

The Frisco Doll decides to keep Sister Annie's promise of rescuing the mission and raises the money by combining soul-shaking sermon and song with street smarts. She's romanced both by a beautiful young Sheriff being generally investigative, and the blustering, slightly crazy ship's captain, Bull Brackett. Klondike Annie/Rose Carlton/The Frisco doll knows in the end to turn herself in and prove her innocence by way of self-defence. Steaming back to San Francisco with Captain Brackett -- "Bull, ya ain't no oil paintin', but ya are a fascinatin' monster".

Cast
 Mae West as The Frisco Doll / Rose Carlton / Sister Annie Alden
 Victor McLaglen as Bull Brackett
 Phillip Reed as Insp. Jack Forrest
 Helen Jerome Eddy as Sister Annie Alden
 Harry Beresford as Brother Bowser
 Harold Huber as Chan Lo
 Lucile Gleason as Big Tess (as Lucille Webster Gleason)
 Conway Tearle as Vance Palmer
 Esther Howard as Fanny Radler
 Soo Yong as Fah Wong, Rose's Maid
 John Rogers as Buddie
 Ted Oliver as Grigsby
 Lawrence Grant as Sir Gilbert
 Gene Austin as Organist
 Vladimar Bykoff as Marinoff

Production 
Production began on September 16, 1935 and concluded in December of that year. Klondike Annie was released February 21, 1936 at a production cost of $1,000,000.

Censorship
As usual with West's films, scenes were deleted to make this film presentable in most markets. Eight minutes of the film were deleted. The footage is presumably lost. In this lost footage is the scene in which The Frisco Doll stabs Chan Lo when he was going to stab her instead. The other lost scene is when The Frisco Doll switched identities with Sister Annie and dressed Sister Annie up as a prostitute. The veiled connection of Sister Annie and The Salvation Army made this scene inappropriate to the censors but its deletion made the final print of the film appear choppy.

The State of Georgia went so far as to ban this film outright.

The film caused a rift between West and William Randolph Hearst, who decided never to print West's name in any of his newspapers. The reason given was the racy material of the film and West's sexual persona in a religious setting. This may seem hypocritical due to his extramarital affair with actress Marion Davies. West was quoted as saying "I may have invited censorship into Hollywood, but I also saved the industry and Paramount."

Soundtrack 
The songs were composed by Gene Austin, who also appeared in the film.

Reception
Writing for The Spectator in 1936, Graham Greene gave the film a good review, declaring that "I thought the whole film fun, more fun than any other of Miss West's since the superb period piece, She Done Him Wrong". Acknowledging his view as a minority opinion, Greene noted that his interpretation of West's characterization of Salvationism to have been harmless fun and not as a satire on religion. Greene also praised McLaglen for his performance.

References

External links
 
 
 
 

1936 films
American Western (genre) films
1936 Western (genre) films
American black-and-white films
American films based on plays
Films directed by Raoul Walsh
Films scored by Victor Young
Paramount Pictures films
Films with screenplays by Mae West
1930s English-language films
1930s American films